Pimelea ammocharis is a species of small shrub in the family Thymelaeaceae. It is a small shrub with white-yellow to orange flowers and is endemic to Western Australia.

Description
The male flowers are mostly evenly hairy or hairs slightly longer near the base. Flowering occurs from March to October.

Taxonomy and naming
Pimelea ammocharis was first formally described in 1857 by Ferdinand von Mueller and the description was published in Hooker's Journal of Botany and Kew Garden Miscellany. The specific epithet (ammocharis) is derived from ammos meaning "sand" and charis meaning "grace".

Distribution and habitat
This species occurs from the southern part of the Kimberley  to the Kennedy-Blackstone Range and east to central Northern Territory  usually along watercourses or red sandy soil and rocky outcrops in dryer regions.

References

ammocharis
Malvales of Australia
Taxa named by Ferdinand von Mueller
Plants described in 1857